McLaughlin Eastshore State Park is a state park and wildlife refuge along the San Francisco Bay shoreline of the East Bay between the cities of Richmond, Albany, Berkeley, Emeryville, and Oakland. It encompasses remnant natural wetlands, restored wetlands, as well as landfill west of the Eastshore Freeway. Originally named just Eastshore State Park, it was renamed in October 2012 to honor the late Save the Bay founder Sylvia McLaughlin, who, along with the late Dwight Steele of Citizens for Eastshore Park (now Citizens for East Shore Parks), drove the establishment of the park. Prior to 2013, it was jointly managed by the California State Parks and East Bay Regional Park District (EBRPD). The state agency and EBRPD executed a 30-year agreement for EBRPD to manage the park.

History
During the 1960s, it became obvious that the East Shore of the San Francisco Bay was suffering from rapid commercial development and the accumulation of trash. In particular, a  tract north of the Bay Bridge that extended between the cities of Emeryville and Richmond attracted the attention of commercial developers and environmental activists alike, though for different reasons. The waterfront property, primarily owned by Catellus Development Corporation—a subsidiary of the Atchison, Topeka and Santa Fe Railway (Santa Fe for short)—was already worth many millions of dollars, and would be worth far more if developed with shopping centers and high-rise hotels.

Sylvia McLaughlin, a local housewife turned environmental activist, was alarmed enough by the situation to recruit friends and associates to form the non-profit Save San Francisco Bay Association, later renamed as Save the Bay. The newly formed association leaped into action, forming a shoreline park committee that began discussing how to raise funds for a small park in Berkeley in 1963. However, Save the Bay leaders soon realized that halting the dumping of material into the bay was a more urgent problem. In 1969 the state's Bay Conservation and Development Commission (BCDC) went from being an interim agency to a permanent state planning and regulatory entity. BCDC backed the idea that the state park system should buy the land. However California State Parks, which had little experience managing urban land and little interest in the complicated challenges of this particular polluted parcel, showed no interest in taking on the property. EBRPD, which was already operating eight urban shoreline parks, thought Cal Parks should be the lead agency. Furthermore, Santa Fe's owners felt certain that their property would become much more valuable if it remained in their hands.

Santa Fe had a temporary setback in 1972, when the Berkeley City Council voted against allowing a proposed regional shopping center to be built atop a landfill. Santa Fe sued the city but lost the case in 1980, when the Supreme Court of California rejected the planned construction. A second setback had already occurred when the BCDC rejected Santa Fe's plan to build several high-rise buildings over wetlands in Emeryville. The Emeryville project became known by local people as "stilt city". Soon after the Supreme Court ruling, the California State Park and Recreation Commission put the shoreline park on its list of priority projects to fund and issued an official East Bay Shoreline Report recommending establishment of an East Bay shoreline park and identified key lands for inclusion. Further progress on the park stopped when Republican George Deukmejian was elected Governor in 1983.

Santa Fe continued its strategy of promoting large-scale development projects along the shorelines of Emeryville, Berkeley, and Albany. Its real estate subsidiary, Catellus Development Company, lost more court battles in the three cities before giving up in 1990. In 1998, with the state's finances recovering, voters approved two bond issues, one state and one regional, raising $40 million for purchasing land for the new Eastshore park. Also, a 1998 act in the California State Legislature authorized EBRPD to act for the state and use state funds to buy land for and operate the new Eastshore park.

EBRPD had bought properties known as the Emeryville Crescent, Albany Mudflats, and part of Hoffman Marsh by 1992. By 1998 it had also purchased the Berkeley Meadow, Brickyard Cove, and the North Basin Strip (together considered of greater value than the narrow shoreline parcels). Catellus wanted $80 million for the former Santa Fe tract, but ultimately settled for $27.5 million after EBRPD threatened to employ eminent domain to acquire the property.

In addition to the complicated process of buying parcels of land and landfill that would become the future state park, how areas were to be used was and remains controversial. The City of Berkeley was to have contributed its former landfill to become one of the larger areas of "upland" (dry land) for the park but held it back, apparently out of concerns that recreation would be overly restricted. (That 90 acres or so of capped landfill is now Cesar Chavez Park.) Albany's former landfill, the Albany Bulb, was hotly disputed—on one end of the spectrum, some wanted it to be entirely a conservation area that did not allow people; on the other, park users wanted continued access and recreation—and set aside to be transferred at some later point into the state park. (As of 2020, that has not happened.) North Point Isabel, a toxic landfill that was remediated and capped in the mid-1980s, had been popular for recreation, including off-leash dog walking. Sierra Club, Citizens for East Shore Parks, Golden Gate Audubon Society and others worked to restrict recreation on that spit of land and require dogs to be on-leash-only. In response to tremendous public support, state park planners authorized the continued use of North Point Isabel for off-leash recreation. Sierra Club opposed that.

Improvement projects funded in 2016
The height of the pile will be lowered  by grading, using the dirt to create small hills that would act as a buffer between the park and the adjacent freeway. The hills are to be seeded with native grasses, adding or improving habitat for shorebirds and other wildlife. A second contract will simultaneously complete the previously-approved restoration of Albany Beach, which includes "... beach and dune enhancements, a non-motorized boat launch, restroom, parking and about a mile of the Bay Trail west of Golden Gate Fields."

Adjacent parks
 Aquatic Park
 Cesar Chavez Park
 Point Isabel Regional Shoreline
 Albany Bulb

Notes

See also

 San Francisco Bay Trail
 Citizens for East Shore Parks (CESP)

References

External links
 Eastshore State Park - East Bay Parks official site
 Eastshore State Park - CA.gov official site

Albany, California
East Bay Regional Park District
Emeryville, California
Geography of Oakland, California
Parks in Alameda County, California
Parks in Berkeley, California
Parks in Richmond, California
San Francisco Bay
State parks of California
San Francisco Bay Trail
Articles with WikiMiniAtlas displaying incorrectly; WMA not showing area